The Left Union for a Clean and Holy Republic (LSCHSR) was a Bulgarian left-wing nationalist electoral alliance which ran in the July 2021 Bulgarian parliamentary election and in the 2021 Bulgarian general election.

History 
An alliance of left-wing, nationalist, and socialist forces, it was formed by the Bulgarian Progressive Line, the Left Alternative, the Party of the Bulgarian Communists, the Socialist Party "Bulgarian Way", and the more conservative Revival of the Fatherland.

Election results

References

2021 disestablishments in Bulgaria
2021 establishments in Bulgaria
Defunct left-wing political party alliances
Defunct political party alliances in Bulgaria
Political parties disestablished in 2021
Political parties established in 2021
Socialist parties in Bulgaria